William Michael Osborne (born 24 April 1955) is a former New Zealand rugby union player. A second five-eighth and centre, Osborne represented Wanganui and Waikato at a provincial level. Started his club career with the local Kaierau Rugby Union Club in Wanganui. He was a member of the New Zealand national side, the All Blacks, between 1975 and 1982, playing 48 matches including 16 internationals.

References

1955 births
Living people
Rugby union players from Whanganui
People educated at Wanganui High School
New Zealand rugby union players
New Zealand international rugby union players
Wanganui rugby union players
Waikato rugby union players
Māori All Blacks players
Rugby union centres